Margaret L. Klenck, M.Div., LP (born January 9, 1953 in Reading, Pennsylvania, USA), is a former American stage and screen actor and a leader of the Jungian analysis profession and president of the Jungian Psychoanalytic Association.

Career

Acting
Her acting career began after her graduation in 1977 from the American Conservatory Theater in San Francisco. In 1978 she began portraying Edwina "Cookie" Lewis Dane on the soap opera One Life to Live and continued in that role until 1985. She also played Kitty Fielding on As the World Turns in 1993. She has also performed in theaters across the country and on Broadway, and gave a critically acclaimed starring performance in the 1986 film Hard Choices (1986), in which she played a social worker who becomes romantically involved with a drug dealer. She has also appeared in numerous movies of the week and episodic TV guest-star roles. She portrayed a rural veterinarian in the "Peregrine" episode of the science fiction series Starman that aired in November 1986. As part of the promotion for her soap opera work, Klenck appeared in a two-part filmed television segment discussing and showing the cutting of her long hair to a shorter style.

Jungian analyst
She is a Jungian Analyst in private practice in New York City and the president of the Jungian Psychoanalytic Association in New York, where she also teaches and supervises. She is a member of the C. G. Jung Institute of Philadelphia and has served on the faculty there and at the Blanton-Peale Institute. She has lectured and taught nationally and internationally as an authority on the life and thought of Carl Jung. She is a graduate of the C.G. Jung Institute of New York and holds the Masters of Divinity (M.Div.) from Union Theological Seminary (New York), where she concentrated in Psychology and Religion. In 2004 she participated in a discussion with scientists, theorists and professors presented as a documentary in two parts by PBS as The Question of God: Sigmund Freud and C.S. Lewis, discussing the existence or non-existence of God based on ideas about the sources of morality and other indications.

Erroneous obituary
The New York Times erroneously printed her obituary prominently in its August 26, 1993 issue, confusing her with the late African American actress whose name, Edwina Lewis, matched the name of the character Klenck played on One Life to Live. Lewis died of a heart attack at age 42 three days before the obituary appeared,  Klenck's agent at Ambrosio/Mortimer reported that they began answering the telephone by saying, "Ambrosio/Mortimer-She's-Not-Dead" because of the volume of calls about Klenck's status. At the time Klenck commented, "The Times and Variety—just great. It means I'm dead on both coasts. If there was an upside, I got to attend my own funeral, in a way. There were memorials being planned. I saw that many people out there loved and respected me." She commented later that by coincidence this obituary marked her transition from acting to her present profession in Jungian psychology.

Personal life
She is married to cinematographer and director Tom Hurwitz; they have one child.

References

External links

American television actresses
Living people
Actors from Reading, Pennsylvania
1953 births
21st-century American women